The discography of Irish chamber pop band the Divine Comedy consists of twelve studio albums, two live albums, two compilation albums, five extended plays and twenty-six singles.

Albums

Studio albums

Footnotes

Live albums

Compilation albums

Box sets

Extended plays

Singles

DVDs
Live at the Palladium (2004) – with the Millennia Ensemble

Contributions
Appearing as either the Divine Comedy or Neil Hannon:
"Life's What You Make It", on the various artists compilation album Volume 9 (1994)
"There Is a Light That Never Goes Out", on the various artists Smiths tribute album The Smiths Is Dead (1996)
"All Mine", a duet with Tom Jones, on his album Reload (1999)
"I've Been to a Marvelous Party", on the various artists Noël Coward tribute album Twentieth-Century Blues: The Songs of Noël Coward (1998)
"No Regrets" (backing vocals), on the Robbie Williams album I've Been Expecting You (1998)
"The Dead Only Quickly", on the 6ths' album Hyacinths and Thistles (1999)
"Life on Mars", with Yann Tiersen, on his album Black Session (1999)
"The Good Life" and "The Good Life (piano version)", on the Gangster No. 1 soundtrack (2000)
"Les Jours Tristes", with Yann Tiersen, on his album L'Absente (2001)
"Jacky", on the various artists Jacques Brel tribute album Next: A Tribute to Jacques Brel (2004)
"October", on the various artists U2 tribute album Even Better Than the Real Thing Vol. 3 (2005)
"So Long and Thanks for All the Fish (Reprise)" and "Vote Beeblebrox" (co-vocals), on the Hitchhiker's Guide to the Galaxy soundtrack (2005)
"Home", on the Jane Birkin album Fictions (2006)
"Three Cheers for Pooh, Cottleston Pie, Piglet Ho", on the various artists charity album Colours Are Brighter (2006)
"Aliens", on the various artists charity album The Cake Sale (2006)
"Love Don't Roam" and "Song for Ten", on the Doctor Who: Original Television Soundtrack (2006)
"Take Me Away", on Pugwash's album Eleven Modern Antiquities (2008)
"Our Love Goes Deeper Than This" by Duke Special, on the 2-CD version of Songs from the Deep Forest (2006)
"Somewhere Between Waking and Sleeping", on Air's album Pocket Symphony (2007)
"Perfection as a Hipster", by God Help the Girl, from the soundtrack album God Help the Girl (2009)
"Oscar the Hypno-Dog", on the various artists charity album Oscar the Hypno-Dog and Other Tails (2012)

References

 
Discographies of British artists
Rock music discographies